Sundaram Jayalakshmi (25 July 1920 - 21 July 2007) was an Indian Tamil-language film actress and singer  who played lead parts in movies of the 1930s and 1940s. Starting her film career with Seetha Kalyanam in 1934, she acted in about a dozen movies, her most remembered role being in the 1943 movie Sivakavi. She is the sister of musicians S. Rajam and S. Balachander.

Early life 

Jayalakshmi was born on 25 July 1920 in Madras to lawyer V. Sundaram Iyer and his wife Parvathi. In 1933, when V. Shantaram wanted to make a Tamil movie and placed an advertisement in Sight and Sound magazine, Sundaram Iyer came forward to help him and as a result the whole family travelled to Kolhapur to make their debut in the movie Seetha Kalyanam with Jayalakshmi as the heroine Seetha and her older brother Rajam as the hero Rama.

Death 

Jayalakshmi died at her residence in Besant Nagar, Chennai of natural causes at 6 AM on 21 July 2007.

References

External links

Indian film actresses
Tamil actresses
2007 deaths
1920 births
Actresses from Mumbai